Visitors to El Salvador must obtain a visa from one of the Salvadoran diplomatic missions unless they come from one of the visa exempt countries. All visitors must hold a passport valid for 6 months.

Visa policy map

Visa exemption 
Holders of passports of the following 87 jurisdictions can visit El Salvador without a visa for up to 180 days (all visitors except the nationals of Belize, Costa Rica, Guatemala, Honduras, Nicaragua and Panama must hold proof of sufficient funds to cover their stay and documents required for next destination):

ID - May also enter with an ID card if come from a country that is part of the CA-4 Agreement.

Visa exemption also applies to residents of countries that are visa exempt as well as holders of a valid visa issued by Canada, the United States or a Schengen member state. This does not apply to nationals of Afghanistan, Algeria, Angola, Armenia, Bangladesh, Bosnia and Herzegovina, Botswana, Cameroon, China, Republic of the Congo, Democratic Republic of the Congo, Eritrea, Ethiopia, Ghana, Haiti, Indonesia, Iran, Iraq, Jordan, Kenya, Laos, Lebanon, Liberia, Libya, Mali, Mongolia, Mozambique, Nepal, Nigeria, North Korea, Oman, Pakistan, Palestine, Sierra Leone, Somalia, Sri Lanka, Sudan, Syria, Taiwan, Timor-Leste, Vietnam and Yemen who also can't obtain a visa on a simplified procedure but their application needs to be approved in El Salvador.

Holders of diplomatic, official or service passports of Belarus, Bolivia, Cuba, Dominica, Dominican Republic, Egypt, Grenada, Guyana, Haiti, Indonesia, Jamaica, Jordan, Kenya, Montenegro, Morocco, Pakistan, Papua New Guinea, Peru, Philippines, Serbia, Suriname, Thailand, Venezuela and Vietnam do not require a visa.

Transit without a visa is allowed for travellers who normally require a visa but are transiting within 48 hours and hold onward tickets.

Tourist card
All visitors must obtain a tourist card upon arrival (US$12). Exempt are the visitors holding a valid visa issued by El Salvador and the citizens of the European Union / EEA (except Bulgaria, Croatia and Romania), Argentina, Chile, Colombia, Costa Rica, Guatemala, Honduras, Monaco, New Zealand, Nicaragua, Panama, Paraguay, Saint Kitts and Nevis, Saint Lucia, Saint Vincent and the Grenadines, San Marino, Sao Tome and Principe, South Africa, Switzerland, Turkey, Trinidad and Tobago, Uruguay and Vatican City.

Central America-4 Border Control Agreement 
The Central America-4 Border Control Agreement is a treaty between Guatemala, El Salvador, Honduras and Nicaragua. A visa issued by one of the four countries is honored by all four of the countries. The time period for the visa, however, applies to the total time spent in any of the four countries without leaving the CA-4 area.

Visitor statistics
Most visitors arriving to El Salvador for the purpose of tourism (excluding those on a one-day visit) were nationals of the following countries:

See also

 Central America-4 Border Control Agreement
 Visa requirements for El Salvador citizens

References 

El Salvador
Foreign relations of El Salvador